Anthony Liu (born Liu Yueming on 4 July 1974) is a Chinese-Australian figure skater. A seven-time Australian national champion, he represented Australia at the 1998 Winter Olympics, where he placed 25th, and at the 2002 Winter Olympics, where he placed 10th.

Personal life 
Liu was born on 4 July 1974 in Qiqihar, China. He moved with his family to Australia in 1994 and became a citizen in August 1996.

Career 
Early in his skating career, Liu represented China under the given name Yueming. He placed 6th at the 1993 World Junior Championships and 21st at the senior World Championships later that season. He won the 1993 Winter Universiade.

In 1996, he began competing for Australia as Anthony Liu. He won his national title and was sent to the World Championships, where he finished 22nd. The next season, Liu earned a berth to the 1998 Winter Olympics in Nagano and placed 25th. At the 1998 Australian Nationals, he became the first Australian skater to land a quadruple jump (toe loop). On his way to his career-best Four Continents result, 5th in 1999, Liu landed a quadruple-triple toe loop combination.

In 2002, Liu achieved a 10th-place finish in his second Olympics. Alongside Adrian Swan (Oslo 1952), it was Australia's best Olympic result in figure skating. He ended the season with his career-best Worlds result, 7th.

Programs

Results 
GP: Grand Prix

For Australia

For China

References

External links 
 

1974 births
Living people
Chinese male single skaters
Australian male single skaters
Figure skaters at the 1998 Winter Olympics
Figure skaters at the 2002 Winter Olympics
Olympic figure skaters of Australia
Australian people of Chinese descent
Sportspeople from Qiqihar
Universiade medalists in figure skating
Universiade gold medalists for China
Competitors at the 1993 Winter Universiade
Figure skaters from Heilongjiang
Competitors at the 2001 Goodwill Games